Wellington Aleixo dos Santos (born 5 January 1985), known as Wellington Saci, is a Brazilian footballer who plays as a left back for Joinville.

He is named after the folk creature Saci, a one-legged black leprechaun of sorts.

Biography
Born in Belém, Pará, Wellington Saci started his career at Ananindeua, signed a 1-year contract. He then played for Extrema and Vênus before signed by Remo in May 2007.

In January 2008 he was signed by Itumbiara.

Corinthians and loans
In May he left for Corinthians, with Itumbiara retained 50% economic rights. An investor "Fair Play Sports" also owned 15%, made Corinthians only 35%. He costed Corinthians R$ 624,000. He won the second division and promoted back to top division. In July 2009 he moved to Atlético Mineiro in 1-year contract. In February 2010 he left for Goiás, finished as the 2010 Copa Sudamericana runner-up.

In January 2011 he left for Sport Recife. In January 2012 he left for Esporte Clube Vitória

Honours
Itumbiara
 Goiás state championship: 2008

Corinthians
 Brazilian Série B: 2008
 São Paulo state championship: 2009
 Brazilian Cup: 2009

Joinville
 Brazilian Série B: 2014

individual
2008: Chosen as the best player in the state of Goiás Championship

Career statistics

References

External links
 Profile on CBF
 
 

Brazilian footballers
Campeonato Brasileiro Série A players
Campeonato Brasileiro Série B players
Campeonato Brasileiro Série C players
Campeonato Brasileiro Série D players
Clube do Remo players
Itumbiara Esporte Clube players
Sport Club Corinthians Paulista players
Clube Atlético Mineiro players
Goiás Esporte Clube players
Sport Club do Recife players
Esporte Clube Vitória players
Club Athletico Paranaense players
Figueirense FC players
Joinville Esporte Clube players
Clube de Regatas Brasil players
Criciúma Esporte Clube players
Madureira Esporte Clube players
Esporte Clube Água Santa players
Brasiliense Futebol Clube players
Association football fullbacks
Sportspeople from Belém
1985 births
Living people